{{DISPLAYTITLE:Kappa1 Sagittarii}}

Kappa1 Sagittarii (κ1 Sagittarii) is a solitary, white-hued star in the zodiac constellation of Sagittarius. It has an apparent visual magnitude of +5.58, which is bright enough to be faintly visible to the naked eye. According to the Bortle scale, it can be viewed from dark suburban skies. Based upon an annual parallax shift of 15.12 mas as seen from Earth, this star is located around 223 light years from the Sun. It is advancing in the general direction of the Sun with a radial velocity of −11.6 km/s.

This is an A-type main sequence star with a stellar classification of A0 V. It displays an infrared excess, with the measured radiation indicating the star is orbited by a two-component debris disk. The star is about 161 million years old with 2.23 times the mass of the Sun and 1.7 times the Sun's radius. It is radiating 27.5 times the Sun's luminosity from its photosphere at an effective temperature of roughly 9,962 K.

There are two visual companions: component B is a magnitude 12.6 star at an angular separation of 39.3 arc seconds along a position angle of 312°, as of 2000; component C is magnitude 11.6 with a separation of 56.8 arc seconds along a position angle of 283°, as of 1999. Neither star is physically associated with Kappa1 Sagittarii.

References

A-type main-sequence stars
Circumstellar disks
Sagittarii, Kappa
Sagittarius (constellation)
Durchmusterung objects
193571
100469
7779